Shariki (Russian: Ша́рики, "The Marbles") is a  puzzle video game written in 1994 for MS-DOS by Russian developer Eugene Alemzhin. The goal of the game is to gain progressively higher scores by matching three or more balls of the same color in a line (vertical or horizontal), by swapping adjacent balls. Each swap must result in a match. Matched balls are then removed, and new ones drop from the top to fill the gaps. The game is over when no more matches are possible in the game field.

Legacy 
Shariki proved to be influential and eventually many games that closely matched its mechanics arose. Collectively known as tile-matching video games or match-three games, these all revolve around the mechanic of creating a three-in-a-row line of identical pieces.  They include:
 Bejeweled (2001) by PopCap Games
 Jewel Quest (2004) created and published by iWin
 Puzzle Quest: Challenge of the Warlords (2007) developed by Infinite Interactive and published by D3 Publisher
 Aurora Feint (2008) game for the iPhone and iPod Touch
 Candy Crush Saga (2012)
 Pokémon Shuffle (2015) game for the Nintendo 3DS handheld console

References

External links 
 Article Shariki: The Predecessor of Bejeweled and Puzzle Quest
 Museum of Shariki games (in Russian)
Play Shariki at the Internet Archive
1994 video games
Video games developed in Russia
DOS games
Windows games
Tile-matching video games